Wailagi Lala (pronounced ) is the northernmost outpost of Fiji's Lau Islands. It is the only true atoll in Fiji.

Literally translated as "no water or rain", Wailagilala lies to the eastern sea border of the Fiji archipelago in the South Pacific, and is the gateway to Fiji for ships coming or going to Samoa through the Nanuku Passage. Its crystal-clear waters are attributed to its remote location and lack of terrestrial water run-off.

It is believed to have been prefabricated in England and shipped in sections to the South Pacific. The island has been uninhabited since the lighthouse was converted to automatic operation.

Dominated by its lighthouse, the sand island is surrounded by spectacular lagoon and coral reefs. The reef protecting the island has a deep, wide, fairly well marked pass that appears to have been blasted through it, allowing easy passage into the lagoon and the sandy anchorage just off the island.

The island is composed of carbonate sands and gravel, and beach-rock. Alexander Agassiz bored a hole there late in the 19th century.

The seabird nesting colony and marine ecosystem of the atoll contribute to its national significance as outlined in Fiji's Biodiversity Strategy and Action Plan.

The island was leased in early 2007 and will be developed as a luxury private retreat.

See also

 Desert island
 List of islands

References

Uninhabited islands of Fiji
Lau Islands
Preliminary Register of Sites of National Significance in Fiji